Sergey Yuryevich Terekhov (born 27 June 1990) is a Russian footballer who plays as a left-back for PFC Sochi.

Club career
He made his professional debut in the Russian First Division in 2008 for FC Dynamo Bryansk. He made his Russian Premier League debut on 17 October 2009 for FC Dynamo Moscow against FC Tom Tomsk.

On 6 August 2020, he joined PFC Sochi on loan for the 2020–21 season. On 31 May 2021, FC Orenburg confirmed that Sochi purchased his rights on a permanent basis.

International career
He was called up to the Russia national football team for the first time for World Cup qualifiers against Croatia, Cyprus and Malta in September 2021. He made his debut on 8 October 2021 against Slovakia.

Career statistics

Notes

External links

References

1990 births
Sportspeople from Bryansk
Living people
Russian footballers
Russia youth international footballers
Russia under-21 international footballers
Russia international footballers
Association football defenders
FC Dynamo Bryansk players
FC Dynamo Moscow players
FC Khimki players
FC Baltika Kaliningrad players
FC Volgar Astrakhan players
FC Orenburg players
PFC Sochi players
Russian Premier League players
Russian First League players